Drought in Korea is similar to that of other portions of the globe.

Events

2010s
A drought beginning in June 2015 affected both South and North Korea. The amount of rain that year was in places less than half of average, following a dry year in 2014. On 19 June, the water level in the Soyang Dam was —the lowest recorded water level since its creation on 24 June 1978, when the water level was —and the Soyang Lake completely evaporated. North Korea was also affected by extreme drought with the United Nations estimating approximately US$110 million of support would be needed.

See also  
El Niño
Effects of global warming § Water resources

References 

Natural disasters in North Korea
Natural disasters in South Korea
Korea
Water in South Korea
Water in North Korea
Korea